Jerome I. Case High School (also known as Case, J. I. Case or Racine Case High School) is located in Mount Pleasant, Wisconsin, a suburb of Racine in the United States. It is a public school for grades 9 to 12 with an estimated student enrollment of 2,022.

Built in 1966, Case was named for Jerome Increase Case, founder of Racine Threshing Works, now a part of CNH Global. Case students are divided into three academies: Business, Health Sciences, and Computer Science Education and Technical Services. The school mascot is "Casey the Eagle". The school is the first of ten authorized Wisconsin high schools to offer the International Baccalaureate program. After a recent application process in May 2015, Case earned the approval from IBO to become an IB Career Programme Candidate school. This will mark the fourth programme of the Racine Unified IB continuum.

Case is an Academy of Racine, which is a program released by RUSD with hopes to give students the opportunity to become "College or career ready".

It serves residents of: Sturtevant, Mount Pleasant and sections of Caledonia.

Athletics
Case won state championships in boys cross country in 1973, 1975 and 1989.

Notable alumni
 Jesse Marsch, Major League Soccer player and coach
 Duane Kuiper, Major League Baseball player and broadcaster
 Linda Leigh, botanist and Biosphere 2 crew member
 Rick Limpert, No. 1 Sports Tech Writer in USA, Best Selling Author, The Invaluable Experience with, professional tennis player, Danielle Lao. 
 Samantha Logic, basketball player
 Kim Merritt - American long-distance runner
 Tom Sorensen - American volleyball player
 Hari Ananth, entrepreneur and founder of the technology company Jobr (acquired by Monster.com)

References

External links
Case High School website
Racine Unified School District website

During the 1965-1967 school years, the students attended Horlick.

High schools in Racine, Wisconsin
International Baccalaureate schools in Wisconsin
Educational institutions established in 1966
Public high schools in Wisconsin
1966 establishments in Wisconsin